Arron Mosby (born April 13, 1999) is an American football linebacker for the Carolina Panthers of the National Football League (NFL).

Early life and education
Mosby was born on April 13, 1999, in Sanger, California. He attended Sanger Union High School and was a two-way starter, playing at wide receiver on offense and cornerback on defense. He was twice named all-league as a defensive back and was given first-team all-CMAC honors in 2016 as a senior. That year, he was named a Fresno Bee all-star.

After graduating from Sanger, Mosby committed to Fresno State University and played in every game as a true freshman, mainly as a special teamer. He made a total of five tackles in 14 games. As a sophomore in 2018, Mosby recorded 12 tackles and one interception while appearing in 13 out of 14 games. His one interception was returned 95 yards for a touchdown against San Jose State and was the fourth-longest in team history.

Mosby recorded 78 tackles as a junior in 2019, placing fourth on the squad. He appeared in all 12 games, and 40 of his tackles were solo stops. In a 2020 season shortened by COVID-19, Mosby played in all six games and recorded 21 tackles, including three for a loss. All players were given an extra year of eligibility because of the virus, and he opted to return to the team in 2021 as a fifth-year player. Playing defensive end, Mosby started 12 games out of 13 and was named an honorable mention All-Mountain West Conference. He recorded 40 tackles, six sacks, six forced fumbles, two recoveries, and a team-leading 15.5 . He was invited to the Hula Bowl and the NFLPA All-Star Game after the season ended.

Professional career
After going unselected in the 2022 NFL Draft, Mosby was signed by the Carolina Panthers as an undrafted free agent. He was waived at the final roster cuts, but was later re-signed to the practice squad. He was elevated to the active roster for their week one game against the Cleveland Browns, and their week two game against the New York Giants, and made his debut in the latter, appearing on 16 special teams snaps. He was signed to the active roster on September 21, and spent one week there before being waived on September 26, after which he was re-signed to the practice squad. He was promoted back to the active roster on October 15. He was waived on November 19 and re-signed to the practice squad. He signed a reserve/future contract on January 9, 2023.

References

External links
Carolina Panthers bio
Fresno State Bulldogs bio

1999 births
Living people
American football defensive ends
American football linebackers
Players of American football from California
People from Sanger, California
Fresno State Bulldogs football players
Carolina Panthers players